The second cabinet of Olof Palme was the cabinet and Government of Sweden from 8 October 1982 until his assassination on 28 February 1986. The cabinet stayed in office as a caretaker government until 12 March 1986.

The cabinet was a single-party minority government consisting of the Social Democrats. The cabinet was led by Prime Minister Olof Palme who had led his party to victory in the 1982 general election. Olof Palme had previously been Prime Minister from October 1969 until defeat in the 1976 general election.

The cabinet resigned on 12 March 1986 as Olof Palme had been assassinated on 28 February 1986. From 28 February to 12 March 1986 the cabinet was led by Deputy Prime Minister Ingvar Carlsson whose first cabinet succeeded on 12 March 1986.

Ministers 

|}

External links
The Government and the Government Offices of Sweden

1982 establishments in Sweden
Cabinets of Sweden
Politics of Sweden
1986 disestablishments in Sweden
Cabinets established in 1982
Cabinets disestablished in 1986
Olof Palme